The Deloitte Centre is a skyscraper office tower located in Auckland, New Zealand. Built between 2006–2009, it contains 18 levels of offices as well as 4 basement car parks and 3 levels of plant, and a special two storey high architectural feature on the top giving a total height of 100 meters. The building will have 5 stars  in the 'Green Star' environmental rating.

History 

The Deloitte Centre is built on an island site in the CBD, bordered by Queen Street, Shortland Street, Fort Street and Jean Batten Place. The site marks the beginning of the old shoreline of 19th century. Everything north of the tower was under the Waitematā Harbour. The site had previously been occupied by a number of different building including Victoria Arcade (built in 1885), then in 1978 BNZ built their low-rise office block. In 2004, Bank of New Zealand went into negotiations to build a skyscraper.

The new building will incorporate the old facades of the Jean Batten Building on the rear sides and the rear (as seen from Queen Street). The demolition of this heritage building for the new development had created some criticism. The architects counter that significant parts of the older structure were retained or reconstructed after the new building went up, creating a positive combination.

Tenants 
Approximately 56% of the office accommodation as well as 70 car parks and a large retail premises fronting Queen Street has been leased to the Bank of New Zealand.

The remaining 44% of the office accommodation has been leased to Deloitte Services Ltd who occupy levels 11–18 including 100 car parks and the basement changing facilities.

True Alliance is the third major tenant who are leasing the four retail units on ground floor with international brand names such as Lacoste, Ben Sherman, Rockport and the North Face.

The plant room will be situated at the upper levels and at level 7. The ground level will incorporate an entrance and  foyer at the corner of Queen and Shortland Street with the remainder of the ground level providing retail premises.  Four levels of basement car parking will provide 170 car parks accessed from Fort Street.

See also 
 List of tallest buildings in Auckland

References 

Skyscrapers in Auckland
Deloitte
2010s architecture in New Zealand
Skyscraper office buildings in New Zealand
Office buildings completed in 2009
Auckland CBD